Rachel Traets (born 16 August 1998) is a singer from the Netherlands. Traets lives in Wouw, a small village in the south-west of the Netherlands.

In October 2011 she won the Dutch music competition Junior Songfestival 2011 with the song "". She was selected to represent her country in the Junior Eurovision Song Contest 2011 held on 3 December 2011 in Yerevan, Armenia. A few weeks later the title "" was shrunk to "Teenager", which would be the official title for the Dutch entry. She came in second in the actual contest, five points behind the winner: Candy from Georgia. She received 12 points from Latvia and Belgium.

Rachel is preceded by Anna and Senna who represented the Netherlands in the Junior Eurovision Song Contest 2010 and succeeded by Femke who represented the Netherlands in 2012.

Currently, she is in a girlband, Hello August.

Discography

Albums
 Teenager

Singles
 "Ik Ben een teenager"
 "Never Nooit"
 "Nanana"
 "Als Jij Maar Bij Me Bent"
 "Bad Ringtone"
 "Holding On"
 "Wrong Chick" (as part of Hello August)
 "Drunk Again" (as part of Hello August)

References

1998 births
Living people
Dutch child singers
Junior Eurovision Song Contest entrants for the Netherlands
Dutch pop singers
People from Roosendaal
21st-century Dutch singers